Pseudogisostola reichardti is a species of beetle in the family Cerambycidae, and the only species in the genus Pseudogisostola. It was described by Fontes and Martins in 1977.

References

Forsteriini
Beetles described in 1977